Euplagia quadripunctaria, the Jersey Tiger, or Spanish Flag, is a day-flying moth of the family Erebidae. The species was first described by Nikolaus Poda von Neuhaus in 1761. They tend to fly close to Eupatorium cannabinum.

The larvae (caterpillars) are polyphagous, feeding from September to May on nettles (Urtica) and raspberries (Rubus), dandelion (Taraxacum), white deadnettle (Lamium), ground ivy (Glechoma), groundsel (Senecio), plantain (Plantago), borage (Borago), lettuce (Lactuca), and hemp-agrimony (Eupratoria). The insect overwinters as a small larva.

Large groups of adults of subspecies E. q. rhodosensis can be found on occasion aestivating (sheltering from the summer heat) in Petaloudes, on Rhodes, in a place that has become known as the Valley of the Butterflies.

Distribution
Euplagia quadripunctaria is widely distributed in Europe from Estonia and Latvia in the north to the Mediterranean coast and islands in the south. It is also found in western Russia, the southern Urals, Asia Minor, Rhodes and nearby islands, the Near East, Caucasus, southern Turkmenistan, and Iran. Individuals are known to migrate northwards from their regular breeding grounds during the summer.

British Isles
Aside from being frequent in the Channel Islands (whence its common name comes), this species was rarely seen in the British Isles in Victorian times. It was described by William Forsell Kirby as, "a great rarity in the South of England, except one locality in Devonshire." Since then however it has spread more widely in Devon and Cornwall, and has recently been seen more frequently in southern England, especially on the Isle of Wight, in northern Kent, and south London. They have been seen regularly and in numbers every year in London first discovered at Devonshire Road Nature Reserve in Forest Hill since 2004, so it is probable that they have established a breeding colony.

Mothrecording.org shows a string of connected sightings on the South Kent coast from Dover to Rye in the first two decades of the twenty-first century. These are disconnected from the block of sightings in South-West England and so probably came from the Continent directly.

Subspecies
Euplagia quadripunctaria quadripunctaria (Europe, Caucasus, Transcaucasus, northern Anatolia, northern Iran, southern Turkmenistan)
Euplagia quadripunctaria fulgida (South Turkey, Syria, Lebanon)
Euplagia quadripunctaria rhodosensis (Western Turkey and neighboring islands of Greece)

Conservation
This is the only lepidopteran which has been designated as a 'priority species' under Annex II of the Habitats Directive in the European Union, as of 1992, which means areas in which it occurs can be declared Special Areas of Conservation.

References

Further reading
Roesler, U. (1968). "Panaxia quadripunctaria ssp. ingridae ssp. nov. (Lepidoptera, Arctiidae)". Entomologische Zeitschrift. 78 (24): 280–284, Stuttgart.

External links

Butterfly Conservation: Saving butterflies, moths and our environment
Fauna Europaea
Lepiforum e.V.
De Vlinderstichting 
Videos about the Jersey tiger:  and 

Callimorphina
Moths described in 1761
Moths of Europe
Moths of Asia
Taxa named by Nikolaus Poda von Neuhaus